The 2015–16 Iranian Futsal 1st Division will be divided into two phases.

The league will also be composed of 20 teams divided into two divisions of 10 teams each, whose teams will be divided geographically. Teams will play only other teams in their own division, once at home and once away for a total of 14 matches each.

Teams

Group A

Group B 

Note: Paya Sazeh, Yaran Javan Bandar Abbas, Iran Jahan Mashhad and Bazargani Ideal Yazd Withdrew from the league before the start of competition.

League standings

Group A

Group B

Results table

Group A

Group B

Clubs season-progress

Play-off

Clubs season-progress

See also 
 2015–16 Futsal Super League
 2016 Futsal's 2nd Division
 2015–16 Iran Pro League
 2015–16 Azadegan League
 2015–16 Iran Football's 2nd Division
 2015–16 Iran Football's 3rd Division
 2015–16 Hazfi Cup
 Iranian Super Cup

References

External links 
   فوتسال نیوز 
  I.R. Iran Football Federation

Iran Futsal's 1st Division seasons
2015–16 in Iranian futsal leagues